China competed at the 2004 Summer Paralympics, held in Athens, Greece. China topped the medal table for the first time, becoming the first Asian country to top the medal count with more gold medals, more silver medals, and more medals overall than any other nation. This was an improvement from its previous best performance, where they had ranked sixth on the medal tally at the 2000 Summer Paralympics. China also broke the record for the most gold medals, the most silvers medals, the most bronze medals and the most medal overall won by Asian countries at a single Summer Paralympics, which was previously set by South Korea in 1988 with 40 gold, 35 silver and 19 bronze.

Medallists

Multi-medallists

Athletes
Bold athletes are athletes who have won one medal.

Archery
See also Archery at the 2004 Summer ParalympicsMen

|-
|align=left|Zhang Nan
|align=left|Ind. W2
|615
|8
|W 159-148
|W 158-139
|L 92-97
|colspan=3|did not advance
|-
|align=left|Zhu Weiliang
|align=left|Ind. standing
|575
|16
|W 143-136
|W 155-154
|W 97-93
|L 97-88
|colspan=2|did not advance
|}

Women

|-
|align=left|Yanhong Wang|align=left|Ind. recurve Standing
|603
|2
|
|W 136-126
|W 101-91
|W 98-80
|W''' 92-83
|
|}

AthleticsSee also Athletics at the 2004 Summer ParalympicsMen's track events

Men's field events

Women's track events

Women's field events

CyclingSee also Cycling at the 2004 Summer ParalympicsRoad cycling

Track cycling

JudoSee also Judo at the 2004 Summer ParalympicsMen

Women

PowerliftingSee also Powerlifting at the 2004 Summer ParalympicsMen

Women

ShootingSee also Shooting at the 2004 Summer ParalympicsMen

Women

SwimmingSee also Swimming at the 2004 Summer ParalympicsMen

Women

Table tennis

Men's singles

Men's teams

Women's singles

Women's teams

VolleyballSee also Volleyball at the 2004 Summer ParalympicsWomen's team
The team earned a gold medal in this competition.
Chen Yu Ping
Sheng Yu Hong
Yang Yan Ling
Xue Jun
Zhang Xu Fei
Li Li Ping
Zhao Jin Qiu
Zheng Xiong Ying
Gong Bin
Tan Yanhua
Lu Hong Qin

Results

Wheelchair fencingSee also Wheelchair fencing at the 2004 Summer Paralympics''

Men's individual events

Men's team events

Wheelchair tennis

See also
China at the Paralympics
China at the 2004 Summer Olympics

References

External links
Athens 2004 Press Release - IPC
National Paralympic Committee of China (NPCC) - short introduction

Nations at the 2004 Summer Paralympics
2004
Summer Paralympics